Henry L. Newhouse (1874–1929) was an architect  in Chicago, Illinois. His work includes the Milford Theatre (Chicago), Blackstone-State Theater, and Sutherland Hotel. He also designed Elam House (1903) and Chicago Defender Building.

He partnered in the firm Newhouse & Bernham (occasionally misspelled as Newhouse & Burnham) with Felix M. Bernham in 1913. Their projects included the Shoreland Hotel, Mammoth Life and Accident Insurance Company Building, and McVickers Theater (1923).

Jerome Soltan was a draftsman for him and Karl Newhouse.

Newhouse designed several theaters for the Ascher Brothers theater chain. He designed at least two synagogues.

His son Henry L. Newhouse II was also an architect.

Work
Elam House (1903)
Sutherland Hotel. construction began in 1917 but it was not completed until 1925 after it was requisitioned by the U.S. military for use as a hospital. NRHP listed.

Devon Theatre (1915)
Frolic Theater (1915) at 951 East 55th Street
Milford Theatre (Chicago) (1917)
Howard Theater (1918) at 1637 West Howard
Blackstone-State Theater (1919)
Mansion at 5052 South Ellis.
Simon L. Marks mansion (1903) at 4726 S. King Drive
Chicago Defender Building (1899) at 3435 S. Indiana Avenue. Altered circa 1915. Originally, South Side Hebrew Congregation - Kehilath Anshe Dorum (Congregation of Men of the South) (a synagogue).
 
H. Mark flat (1913) at 5344 N Magnolia
Designs for T. G. Dickinson in Washington Park Court
1825 Sylvan Court in Flossmoor, Illinois
Kinzie Building
Orbit Building at Central Park Avenue and Milwaukee Avenue
Columbus Theater (1916) at 6236 South Ashland
Lederer Building
Apartment building for Isadore A. Rubel

References

20th-century American architects
1874 births
1929 deaths